The Russian Union of Engineers (RUE) (Russian: Российский союз инженеров (РСИ)) claims to be an all-Russian nongovernmental organization of engineers, design-engineers, builders, inventors, rationalizers, researchers, scientists, scientific and technical employees, and managers of industrial production. It has published several studies on economics, energy and housing related subjects and a paper on Malaysia Airlines Flight 17.

Social projects 

On January 21, 2012, at the Polytechnical Museum of Moscow, the Russian Union of Engineers presented the general rating of city appeal of Russian cities for 2011.

On May 20, 2013, the Ministry of Regional Development of the Russian Federation, the Federal Agency of Construction and Housing of the Russian Federation, Russian Union of Engineers and the experts of Lomonosov Moscow State University developed a rating and methodology of  evaluation of urban environment and analyzed the 50 largest Russian cities. For this work, the Union designed the methods of urban environment quality assessment and a city appeal threshold.

The rating has been developed:

 by the order the President of the Russian Federation defined in paragraph 1 of Assignments No. Pr-534 of the President of the Russian Federation as of February 29, 2012, to executive bodies as a result of the meeting “On measures of implementation of the housing policy” as of February 14, 2012 
 by the order of the Chairman of the Government of the Russian Federation defined in paragraph 4 of the List of assignments № VP-P9-1581  “On development of a methodology of assessment of urban environment quality and assessment of the major cities of Russia”  of the Chairman of the Government of the Russian Federation as March 20, 2012.

See also 

 Science and technology in Russia

References

Links to sources 
Official website of the Russian Union of Engineers
  Leaders of the Russian Union of Engineers
  Contacts of the Russian Union of Engineers
  Report on activities of the Russian Union of Engineers, Russia 1 channel
  Presentation of the General Rating of Russian Cities, Plekhanov Club
 Democracy in a Technological Society, Langdon Winner, 1992
 The Russian Union of Engineers: The proposal to reduce the tax burden on oil from 55 to 45% - is fully justified
 Russian Union of Engineers came to the conclusion that the Lipetsk almost unfit for life
 The Russian Union of Engineers supports reducing the tax burden on the oil industry
 Novokuznechane leave the city because of the local authorities?
 Russian Union of Engineers presented rating appeal of Russian cities
 The Russian Union of Engineers: Chita characterized by depressive state
 "Russian Union of Engineers': the emergence of the Russian electric prematurely
 After the accident at the Baikonur Cosmodrome launch vehicle "Proton-M" in the "Russian Union of Engineers' expressed the need for the expansion of the Institute of the military office
 The Russian Union of Engineers supports the desire of the authorities to strengthen state control over pricing in the housing sector

Economy of Russia
Non-profit organizations based in Russia
Engineering organizations